Licka is an EP released by artist Acen Razvi in 2002.

Track listing
"Licka (Original)"
"Licka (Remix)"
"Androids Who Dream"
"Moonrider"

2002 EPs